Ingrid Lauridsen (born 5 March 1960) is a Danish TW3 classified wheelchair racer who competed in the Paralympic Games and the IPC Athletics World Championships. She won a silver medal at the 1980 Summer Paralympics in Arnhem and took six gold medals and one bronze medal at the 1984 Summer Paralympics in New York and Stoke Mandeville. Lauridsen finished third in the women's 800 metres wheelchair event  at the 1987 World Championships in Athletics in Rome. She took two gold medals and three bronze medals at the 1988 Summer Paralympics in Seoul and four silver medals at the 1992 Summer Paralympics in Barcelona. Lauridsen won three medals at the 1994 IPC Athletics World Championships in Berlin.

Biography
She was born in Tirstrup, Varde, Denmark, on 5 March 1960. Lauridsen is a paraplegic and used a wheelchair during competition with a classification of TW3 by the International Paralympic Committee. At the 1980 Summer Paralympics in Arnhem, the Netherlands, she won the silver medal in the women's Slalom 2 event. Lauridsen also competed in each of the women's 60 metres 2, women's 200 metres 2, the women's shot put 2 and the women's discus throw 2 but without winning a medal in any of those events.

She attained qualification to the demonstration wheelchair racing events of the 1984 Summer Olympics in Los Angeles at an event held in Uniondale, New York. Lauridsen finished the women's 800 metres wheelchair event in eighth position. She also partook in the 1984 Summer Paralympics in both New York, United States, and Stoke Mandeville, United Kingdom. Lauridsen finished first in each of the women's 100 metres 2; women's 200 metres 2; women's 400 metres 2; women's 800 metres 2; women's 1500 metres 2 and the women's 5000 metres 2 competitions. She also claimed a bronze medal in the women's queen of the straight 100 metres 1A-6 event.

In January 1986, she reset a new world record she had held at the Australian National Wheelchair Games in Adelaide in the women's Class 2 paraplegic 100 metres in winning a Class 4 competition. Lauridsen finished third to claim the bronze medal in the women's 800 metres wheelchair event at the 1987 World Championships in Athletics in Rome. At the 1988 Summer Paralympics in Seoul, South Korea, she won two gold medals in both the women's 400 metres 2 and the women's 800 metres 2 competitions. Lauridsen also secured three bronze medals in each of the women's 1500 metres 2, the women's 5000 metres 2 and the women's 10000 metres 2 events.

She also competed in the wheelchair racing competitions at the 1988 Summer Olympics. Lauridsen finished in fourth position at the women's 800 metres wheelchair race. She placed, fourth in the women's 800 paraplegic event of the 1990 Eight-Country Metro Toronto Wheelchair Challenge Track and Field in Toronto, Canada, and went on to finish second in the women's wheelchair race of the 1990 London Marathon and in the women's marathon wheelchair event at the 1990 Stoke Mandeville Games in Aylesbury, England. Lauridsen also won the women's wheelchair division of the 1990 Canberra Marathon with a new course record. She partook in the 1992 Summer Paralympics in Barcelona, Spain. Laurdisen won silver medals in each of the women's 100 metres TW3; women's 200 metres TW3; women's 400 metres TW3 and the women's 800 metres TW3. Lauridsen also entered the women's 1500 metres TW3-4 competition, finishing tenth overall.

She entered the 1994 IPC Athletics World Championships in Berlin, Germany. Lauridsen was second in the women's T3 100 metres wheelchair, and third in each of the women's T3 400 metres wheelchair and the women's T3 200 metres wheelchair competitions.

References

1960 births
Living people
People from Varde Municipality
20th-century Danish women
21st-century Danish women
People with paraplegia
Paralympic athletes of Denmark
Female wheelchair racers
Paralympic medalists in athletics (track and field)
Paralympic gold medalists in athletics (track and field)
Paralympic gold medalists for Denmark
Paralympic silver medalists for Denmark
Paralympic bronze medalists for Denmark
Medalists at the 1980 Summer Paralympics
Medalists at the 1984 Summer Paralympics
Medalists at the 1988 Summer Paralympics
Medalists at the 1992 Summer Paralympics
Medalists at the World Para Athletics Championships
World Athletics Championships athletes for Denmark
Wheelchair racers at the 1984 Summer Olympics
Wheelchair racers at the 1988 Summer Olympics
Sportspeople from the Region of Southern Denmark